is a 2002 Japanese romance film directed by Kei Kumai, based on a screenplay by Akira Kurosawa.

Cast 
 Misa Shimizu – Kikuno
 Nagiko Tōno – Oshin
 Masatoshi Nagase – Ryosuke
 Hidetaka Yoshioka – Fusanosuke
 Miho Tsumiki – Okichi
 Michiko Kawai – Osono
 Yumiko Nogawa – Omine
 Tenshi Kamogawa – Umekichi
 Yukiya Kitamura – Gonta

References

External links 

2000s romance films
Japanese romance films
2000s Japanese films